Shawswick is an unincorporated community in Shawswick Township, Lawrence County, Indiana.

History
Shawswick contained a post office from 1891 until 1896. The community took its name from Shawswick Township.

Geography

References

Unincorporated communities in Lawrence County, Indiana
Unincorporated communities in Indiana